Ledenice is a market town in České Budějovice District in the South Bohemian Region of the Czech Republic. It has about 2,500 inhabitants.

Administrative parts
Villages of Ohrazení, Ohrazeníčko, Růžov, Zaliny and Zborov are administrative parts of Ledenice.

History
The first written mention of Ledenice is from 1278.

Notable people
Josef Stejskal (1897–1942), theatre director
Vlastimil Hajšman (1928–1978), ice hockey player

References

Populated places in České Budějovice District
Market towns in the Czech Republic